Milan Milutinović (born 19 December 1942) is a Serbian politician who served as the president of Serbia from 1997 to 2002.

He served as Secretary for Education and Science of Serbia (1977–82), Director of the National Library of Serbia (1983–87), Ambassador of the Federal Republic of Yugoslavia to Greece (1989–95), Yugoslavia's Federal Minister of Foreign Affairs (1995–97). After his presidential term expired in December 2002, he surrendered to the International Criminal Tribunal for the Former Yugoslavia where he was tried for war crimes. He was found not guilty on all charges on 26 February 2009.

Education and Youth
Milan Milutinović comes from an old Belgrade family. He was born in Belgrade to Aleksandar, a civil engineer and Ljubica (née Jokić), an art historian. He attended school in Belgrade and graduated from the University of Belgrade Faculty of Law and obtained an LL.M in 1965.

Early political career
From 1969 to 1971, he was a Member of the Presidency of the Yugoslav Socialist Youth Union, and, from 1974-77 Secretary for Ideology of the City Committee of the League of Communists of Belgrade. Milutinović was a Member of the Federal Parliament of the Socialist Federal Republic of Yugoslavia from 1969 to 1974, during which time he served, inter alia, on the Foreign Affairs Committee.

Secretary for Education and Director of the National Library
From 1977 until 1982, Milutinović was the Secretary for Education, Science and Sport of the Socialist Republic of Serbia. During his term, he worked on a comprehensive reform of the education system. His comparative research on higher education systems in Europe was published in his book, University-Eppur si Muove: University Reform-between Tradition and the Future (Belgrade, 1985). Following his term as Secretary for Education, Milan Milutinović was elected Director of the National Library of Serbia following a public competition, a position that he held until 1987.

Foreign Ministry
In 1987, during the term of Federal Secretary Raif Dizdarević, Milan Milutinović joined the Federal Secretariat for Foreign Affairs of the SFRY, as Ambassador and Head of Sector for Press, Information and Culture. In September 1989, Milutinović was appointed Ambassador of the SFRY to Greece.

During much of his term as Ambassador to Greece (between 1992 and 1995), Milutinović was Yugoslavia's only Ambassador to a Western state, as, due to the UN embargo imposed in May 1992, new ambassadors could not be appointed, while Milutinović was never withdrawn by Belgrade. In August 1995, Milutinović was appointed Foreign Minister of the Federal Republic of Yugoslavia. In November 1995, he was one of the leading negotiators during the Bosnia peace negotiations in Dayton, Ohio and one of the draftsmen of what subsequently became the Dayton Peace Accords, which led to the permanent cessation of hostilities in Bosnia-Herzegovina. During his term as Foreign Minister, he also signed several agreements between Yugoslavia and its neighbour Croatia aimed at normalizing relations between the two countries.

Presidential Election 1997
After Slobodan Milošević's second, the last constitutionally allowable, mandate as the President of Serbia, he was controversially elected the president of Yugoslavia. Milošević's Socialist Party of Serbia still wanted to retain the Serbian presidency, and their first candidate in the Serbian presidential elections in 1997 was Zoran Lilić. The first two rounds of elections failed as the necessary majority (under the 1990 Constitution) of population failed to vote.

A coalition of Socialist Party of Serbia, Yugoslav Left and New Democracy decided to change their candidate for the repeated elections, as the leader of the nationalist Serbian Radical Party Vojislav Šešelj won the plurality against Lilić. Many of the opposition parties, led by the Democratic Party, boycotted the 1997 elections as they expected results manipulation.

Milutinović, a member of Socialist Party of Serbia, was the party's choice after Lilić's failure. In the second round of elections, held in December 1997, he won 2,177,462 votes or 59.18% by official count, while 50.96% voters turned out. Vojislav Šešelj, who got 1,383,781 votes or 37.61%, boycotted Milutinović's inauguration ceremony.

Presidency

As Milošević became the President of the Yugoslav Federation, political power shifted to the federal level along with him, and Milutinović de facto enjoyed little political influence. However, Milutinović was the leader of the Yugoslavian government's negotiation group in the Rambouillet Agreement in 1999, a prelude to the NATO campaign against Yugoslavia. He still acted under Milošević's directives.

After Milošević and his party were ousted in October 2000 and their political power marginalized on federal, republic and most local levels, Milutinović still remained in the office, as his term did not end until 2002. His powers as the president were trivialized from 2000 to 2002, since his political affiliation did not enjoy popular support and he could not be backed up by any other government branch. Milutinović was out of the eye of public performing only the most basic constitutional obligations without any opposition to the Democratic Opposition of Serbia coalition. In 2002, when his mandate expired, the presidential elections were held in which Milutinović did not run. He was succeeded by an acting president Nataša Mićić.

During the transition to democracy in late 2000, Milutinović refused to support a violent suppression of the October Demonstrations in Belgrade. The smooth relations between him and the new government, while in office, incurred the dislike of Milošević's closest allies, although there has never been an official rupture. At the same time, Milutinović did not enjoy the support of the Democratic Opposition of Serbia, as he in turn was considered, by most of its members, as a close ally of Milošević.

ICTY indictment

Upon the expiry of his term in office, Milutinović turned himself in to International Criminal Tribunal for the former Yugoslavia (ICTY) in 2003. He was tried under joint war crimes indictment along with Nikola Šainović and Dragoljub Ojdanić.

Milutinović was prosecuted on four counts: deportation, murder as a crime against humanity, murder as violation of laws or customs of war, and "other inhumane acts" during the War in Kosovo. The allegations include responsibility for mass murders at Račak, Bela Crkva, Mala Kruša and Velika Kruša, Đakovica, Padalište, Izbica, Dubadeva, Mbrca, Vucitrn, Meja, Dubrava, Suva Reka and Kačanik, during 1999.

According to the indictment, Milutinović had personal responsibility as the President of Serbia, with power over various governmental institutions. He was a member of the Yugoslavian Supreme Defense Council, thus making decisions in regard to the Yugoslavian Army. He also had a power to dissolve the Serbian Parliament. According to the indictment, during wartime his de jure powers were extended to ones belonging to the Parliament during peacetime, including control of the police, subordinate to the Army at the time. This claim is hotly contested by Milutinović's defense counsel and some constitutional lawyers, as the 1990 Constitution was written in view of Serbia possibly becoming a sovereign, unitary state, due to the impending collapse of Tito's Socialist Federal Republic of Yugoslavia (which finally occurred in mid-1991).

In reality, Serbia was not sovereign, as it still formed part of Milošević's Federal Republic of Yugoslavia, whose President (Milošević) held the post of commander-in-chief of the armed forces. In addition, according to the defense, the Supreme Defense Council was not exercising operational control over Yugoslav troops, neither de jure nor de facto.

The ICTY Prosecution also claimed that Milutinović, as the President of Serbia, had de facto influence over the Parliament, the Army and the police (Ministry of Internal Affairs).

On 26 February 2009, Milutinović was acquitted on charges of war crimes. Finding Milutinović not guilty on all counts of the indictment, the court ruled that Milutinović had "no direct control over the Yugoslav army". Judge Iain Bonomy blamed Slobodan Milošević for the alleged crimes, and said that Milutinović was "not a key player in the ruling political party."

Personal life
Milan Milutinović was married to Olga Milutinović (née Spasojević) from 6 December 1970 until her death, on 20 January 2017. They have one son, Veljko (born 1979). 
Since his acquittal before the ICTY in 2009, Milutinović has returned to live in Belgrade.

References

External links
BETA's chronology of Serbian elections, in Serbian
ICTY indictment, PDF format.
Provisional Release Press Release

1942 births
Living people
Politicians from Belgrade
Serbia and Montenegro politicians
People acquitted by the International Criminal Tribunal for the former Yugoslavia
Presidents of Serbia within Yugoslavia
Candidates for President of Serbia
Ambassadors of Serbia and Montenegro to Greece
Foreign ministers of Yugoslavia
Socialist Party of Serbia politicians
Heads of government who were later imprisoned